Awake, My Soul: The Story of the Sacred Harp is a 2006 documentary film directed by Matt and Erica Hinton, and narrated by Jim Lauderdale. It follows the folk tradition of Sacred Harp singing, a type of shape-note singing, kept alive by amateur singers in the rural American South.

Cast
The Sacred Harp singers:
Richard DeLong
Raymond Hamrick
Richard A. Ivey
Rodney Ivey
Warren Steel
Judy Caudle
Joyce Smith Walton
Hugh McGraw
Carlene Griffin
Charlene Wallace
Jim Carnes
Elene Stovall
Terry Wootten
Jeff and Shelbie Sheppard
Lonnie Rogers
Ted Mercer
William Reynolds

See also
 List of American films of 2006
 Performance practice of Sacred Harp music

References

External links

 
Official website
Official Online Store
Online hub of Sacred harp singing

2006 films
American documentary films
Sacred Harp
Documentary films about music and musicians
2006 documentary films
2000s English-language films
2000s American films